1 Polish, 2 Biscuits & a Fish Sandwich is the debut album of hip-hop duo The Outhere Brothers, released in 1994. It peaked at #56 on the UK Albums Chart. There are multiple versions of the album released each with different covers and modified/different track listings.  The album's title is a reference to a penis, buttocks, and a vagina. The group's following LP The Party Album contained 'clean' versions of many of the tracks here, with alternative 'radio-friendly' lyrics.

Critical reception
Music Week commented, "There's plenty more salacious hip-hop/house where the recent number-one Don't Stop (Wiggle Wiggle) came from."

Track listing

UK version
"I Miss You"
"Don't Stop (Wiggle Wiggle)"
"Boom Boom Boom"
"La La La Hey Hey"
"Bring That Ass Over Here"
"I Want My Shit Back"
"Les Be in Luv"
"Let Me Be the One"
"On My Mind"
"Pass the Toilet Paper"
"Orgasm"
"Outhere Brothers Theme Song"
"Golden Shower"
"Phat Phat Phat"
"Interlude The Halle Jones Show"
"I'll Lick Your Pussy"
"Fuk U in the Ass" (Bend Over Mix)

Bonus tracks on alternative versions
"I Wanna"
"What Up?"
"I Wanna P"
"Chi Town People"
"Phat Phat Phat" (Where Dey At Mix)
"Players Get Lonely"
"Boom Boom Boom" (Smooth Mix)
"Oh Shit!" (New Zealand bonus track)

Charts

References 

1994 debut albums
The Outhere Brothers albums
Elektra Records albums
Warner Records albums